Roman Bezjak (born 21 February 1989) is a Slovenian footballer who plays as a forward for Austrian side USV Wies. He made his debut for the Slovenian national team in 2013.

Club career

Celje 
Bezjak made his debut for Celje on 9 April 2008 against Maribor, coming on as a substitute for the last six minutes. The following season he made his first start for Celje, on 2 August 2008, in a 0–0 home draw against Domžale before being substituted by Saša Bakarić. Two weeks later, he scored his first goal in a 2–2 away draw against Primorje. He began to establish himself in the Celje first team from the 2009–10 season, making 24 league appearances and scoring 6 goals.

Ludogorets Razgrad 
On 22 August 2012, Bezjak signed a four-year contract with Bulgarian A Group side Ludogorets Razgrad. He made his debut for Ludogorets against CSKA Sofia on 22 September where he came on as a substitute in a 1–0 home win. His first goals for Ludogorets came on 3 May 2013 when he scored twice in a 3–0 home win over Chernomorets Burgas. He made 14 appearances during the 2012–13 season, finishing with 5 goals.

In the following season Bezjak became a first team regular. He scored his first goal of the season in the second league game, a 1–0 win at home to Chernomorets Burgas on 27 July 2013. On 27 October 2013, he scored his first-ever career hat-trick, netting four goals in a 5–1 league win over Lyubimets 2007. He also scored three goals in two matches against PSV Eindhoven in the group stage of the Europa League. In February 2014, he netted in both legs of the 4–3 aggregate victory over Lazio in the round of 32 of the Europa League. On 13 March 2014, he earned а penalty kick in the 3–0 home loss against Valencia, but missed from the spot. On 15 May 2014, Bezjak scored the winning goal in the 1–0 victory over Botev Plovdiv in the 2014 Bulgarian Cup Final to help his team achieve a double. He ended the season as the club's top scorer, scoring 20 goals in all competitions.

Rijeka
On 14 May 2015, HNK Rijeka announced that Bezjak had signed a three-year contract, tying him with the club until June 2018. He made his official début for the club on 10 July 2015, in a goalless away draw against Inter Zaprešić in Round 1 of the Croatian First Football League. On 19 July 2015, Bezjak scored a brace in a 3–3 home draw against Slaven Belupo. With 13 goals to his account, he was the club's top scorer during the 2015–16 season.

Jagiellonia Białystok
On 1 February 2018, Bezjak signed a two-and-a-half-year contract with Jagiellonia Białystok. His debut for Jagiellonia was against Piast Gliwice in a 2–0 victory, when he was subbed in during the second half. Bezjak's first goal for the club was on 23 February 2018 against Lechia Gdańsk in a 4–2 win at home.

International career 
Bezjak earned his first cap for Slovenia on 14 August 2013, after coming on as a substitute in the 2–0 loss against Finland in a friendly match. On 23 March 2016, Bezjak scored his first goal for Slovenia in the 1–0 win against Macedonia. On 8 October 2017, Bezjak scored twice for the 2–2 draw between Slovenia and Scotland.

Career statistics

Club

International 

Scores and results list Slovenia's goal tally first, score column indicates score after each Bezjak goal.

Honours 
Ludogorets
 Bulgarian A Group: 2012–13, 2013–14
 Bulgarian Cup: 2013–14
 Bulgarian Supercup: 2014

Rijeka
 Croatian First League: 2016–17

APOEL
 Cypriot First Division: 2018–19
 Cypriot Super Cup: 2019

References

External links

Roman Bezjak at NZS  

1989 births
Living people
Sportspeople from Slovenj Gradec
Slovenian footballers
Association football forwards
NK Celje players
NK Zagorje players
PFC Ludogorets Razgrad players
HNK Rijeka players
SV Darmstadt 98 players
Jagiellonia Białystok players
APOEL FC players
NK Olimpija Ljubljana (2005) players
Balıkesirspor footballers
Slovenian PrvaLiga players
Slovenian Second League players
First Professional Football League (Bulgaria) players
Croatian Football League players
Bundesliga players
2. Bundesliga players
Ekstraklasa players
Cypriot First Division players
TFF First League players
Slovenian expatriate footballers
Expatriate footballers in Bulgaria
Slovenian expatriate sportspeople in Bulgaria
Expatriate footballers in Croatia
Slovenian expatriate sportspeople in Croatia
Expatriate footballers in Germany
Slovenian expatriate sportspeople in Germany
Expatriate footballers in Poland
Slovenian expatriate sportspeople in Poland
Expatriate footballers in Cyprus
Slovenian expatriate sportspeople in Cyprus
Expatriate footballers in Turkey
Slovenian expatriate sportspeople in Turkey
Expatriate footballers in Austria
Slovenian expatriate sportspeople in Austria
Slovenia youth international footballers
Slovenia under-21 international footballers
Slovenia international footballers